Áqá Muḥammad-i-Qá'iní (also known as Fadil-i-Qa'ini ("Learned One of Qa'ín") and surnamed Nabíl-i-Akbar; ‎ 1829–1892) was a distinguished Baháʼí from the town of Qá'in. He is one of 19 Apostles of Baháʼu'lláh, and referred to by ʻAbdu'l-Bahá as a Hand of the Cause of God.

In the abjad notation, the name "Muhammad" has the same numerical value as "Nabíl".

Nabíl-i-Akbar was the recipient of a tablet from Baháʼu'lláh, the Tablet of Wisdom.

ʻAbdu'l-Bahá recounted:
:There was, in the city of Najaf, among the disciples of the widely known mujtahid, Shaykh Murtada, a man without likeness or peer. His name was Aqa Muhammad-i-Qa'ini, and later on he would receive, from the Manifestation, the title of Nabil-i-Akbar. This eminent soul became the leading member of the mujtahid's company of disciples. Singled out from among them all, he alone was given the rank of mujtahid -- for the late Shaykh Murtada was never wont to confer this degree. He excelled not only theology but in other branches of knowledge, such as the humanities, the philosophy of the Illumination, the teachings of the mystics and of the Shaykhi School. He was a universal man, in himself alone a convincing proof. When his eyes were opened to the light of Divine guidance, and he breathed in the fragrances of Heaven, he became a flame of God. Then his heart leapt within him, and in an ecstasy of joy and love, he roared out like leviathan in the deep. – (Memorials of the Faithful, p. 1.) 

Nabíl completed his studentship under Shaykh Murtaday-i-Ansari, and after he had obtained his sanction and blessing, Nabíl moved from Najaf to Baghdad. This teacher was the same Shaykh who refused to associate himself with the Shiʻi divines gathered together to concert plans against Baháʼu'lláh during his time in Baghdad.

It has been claimed that "no one within the enclave of the Baháʼí Faith has ever surpassed the profundity of his erudition". As far as the accomplishment demanded of a Shiʻih mujtahid is concerned, his attainment was superb, but naturally he had little knowledge of the lore and the scholarship of the West. Mírzá Abu'l-Faḍl of Gulpáygán, on the other hand, was well versed in Islamic studies and had a wide and comprehensive knowledge of Western thought as well. (Balyuzi)

Sources

External links 
 Nabíl-i-Akbar, from Memorials of the Faithful.
 Encyclopædia Iranica article

1829 births
1892 deaths
19th-century Bahá'ís
Apostles of Baháʼu'lláh
Hands of the Cause
Iranian Bahá'ís